Diadenosine hexaphosphate hydrolase (ATP-forming) (Ndx1) is an enzyme with systematic name P1,P6-bis(5'-adenosyl)hexaphosphate nucleotidohydrolase (ATP-forming). This enzyme catalyses the following chemical reaction

 (1) P1,P6-bis(5'-adenosyl)hexaphosphate + H2O  2 ATP 
 (2) P1,P5-bis(5'-adenosyl)pentaphosphate + H2O  ATP + ADP
 (3) P1,P4-bis(5'-adenosyl)tetraphosphate + H2O  ATP + AMP

The enzyme requires the presence of the divalent cations (Mn2+, Mg2+, Zn2+, and Co2+).

References

External links 
 

EC 3.6.1